NGC 4214 is a dwarf barred irregular galaxy located around 10 million light-years  away in the constellation Canes Venatici.  NGC 4214 is a member of the M94 Group.

Characteristics 

NGC 4214 is both larger and brighter than the Small Magellanic Cloud as well as a starburst galaxy, with the largest star-forming regions (NGC 4214-I and NGC 4214-II) in the galaxy's center. Of the two, NGC 4214-I contains a super star cluster rich in Wolf-Rayet stars and NGC 4214-II is younger (age less than 3 million years), including a number of star clusters and stellar associations.

NGC 4214 also has two older super star clusters, both with an age of 200 million years and respective masses of 2.6*10.5 and 1.5*106 solar masses.

Two satellites are known to exist around the vicinity of NGC 4214. One is DDO 113, which has an absolute V-band magnitude of −12.2. It stopped star formation around 1 billion years ago. Another, more recently discovered object is MADCASH-2, officially named MADCASH J121007+352635-dw. The name refers to the MADCASH (Magellanic Analog Dwarf Companions and Stellar Halos) project. It is similar to typical ultra-faint dwarf galaxies, with an absolute V-band magnitude of −9.15, except in that shows evidence of multiple episodes star formation in its recent past: one around 400 million years ago, and another 1.5 billion years ago.

See also
 NGC 4236 - a similar irregular galaxy

References

External links
 
 Hubble Heritage site: Detailed information on the HST picture of 4214
 Galaxy NGC 4214: A star formation laboratory ESA/Hubble photo release

Dwarf galaxies
Irregular galaxies
Barred irregular galaxies
Canes Venatici
4214
07278
39225
M94 Group